Ilinykh or Ilinikh is a Russian surname.
Dmitriy Ilinikh (born 1987), Russian volleyball player
Elena Ilinykh (born 1994), Russian ice dancer
Kristina Ilinykh (born 1994), Russian diver
Vladimir Ilinykh (born 1975), Russian politician
Yulia Ilinykh (born 1985), Russian road cyclist

See also
 
 

Russian-language surnames